Baba Kanshi Ram (11 July 1882 – 15 October 1943) was an Indian poet and activist for independence born in what is now the Indian state of Himachal Pradesh.

Independence campaign 

The death sentences handed out to Bhagat Singh, Rajguru and Sukhdev in 1931 had a great impact on him. He vowed to wear black clothes until India achieved its independence. He adhered to his vow until he died on 15 October 1943 and came to be known affectionately as the Siyahposh Jarnail (The Black General).

In 1937, Pandit Jawaharlal Nehru awarded him the title of Pahari Gandhi.

References

Further reading 

Biography by Prof. Narain Chand Parashar

Indian independence activists from Himachal Pradesh
History of Himachal Pradesh
1882 births
1943 deaths
Poets from Himachal Pradesh
20th-century Indian poets
People from Kangra district